Grand Mound can refer to a place in the United States:

Grand Mound, Iowa, a small city
Grand Mound, Washington, a census-designated place
Grand Mound (Minnesota), a prehistoric burial site